Woodstock Dam is located on the upper reaches of the Tugela, KwaZulu-Natal province of South Africa and is the main source of water for the Thukela-Vaal Transfer Scheme. The dam serves mainly for municipal and industrial water supply purposes and its hazard potential has been ranked high (3).

See also 
 List of reservoirs and dams in South Africa

References

Dams in South Africa
Dams completed in 1983